Kleine Lonau is a tributary of the Große Lonau in Lower Saxony, Germany.

It rises at a height of 650 metres and flows through the Mariental valley to Lonau, where it merges with the Große Lonau.

See also
List of rivers of Lower Saxony

Rivers of Lower Saxony
Rivers of the Harz
Göttingen (district)
Rivers of Germany